Leah Kunkel ( Cohen; born June 15, 1948) is an American singer.

Life 
Leah Cohen was born on June 15, 1948. She is the younger sister of Cass Elliot, best known as a member of the folk rock vocal group the Mamas & the Papas. In 1968, she married American drummer and music producer Russ Kunkel. Following Cass's death in 1974, Kunkel was given custody of Cass's daughter, Owen. The couple also raised their son, Nathaniel, later an Emmy Award-winning sound engineer.

After being signed to Dunhill Records, Kunkel recorded her first record, Billy, under the name Cotton Candy. She performed with a few bands and continued growing as a singer and songwriter. In 1972, she sang the counter-melody for "From Silver Lake" on Jackson Browne's eponymous debut album. Following additional session work with Stephen Bishop, Carly Simon, and Arlo Guthrie in the early 1970s, Kunkel appeared on James Taylor's 1977 album JT. That same year, she appeared on Art Garfunkel's album Watermark. Garfunkel relied on her vocal harmonies for his subsequent albums Fate for Breakfast (1979), Scissors Cut (1981), and Lefty (1988), and he became something of a mentor to her, helping to get her a recording contract with Columbia Records in 1979.

In 1979, Kunkel released her first album for Columbia Records, which featured several of her own compositions. The self-titled album produced one single, "Step Right Up". The following year, she released her second solo album for Columbia, I Run With Trouble.

In 1980, Kunkel teamed up with Marty Gwinn to form the Coyote Sisters. In 1984, they released their first album, The Coyote Sisters, on Lorimar Records. A follow-up album, Women and Other Visions, was released in 2001. The Coyote Sisters continue to perform with Kunkel, who also continues to appear as a solo performer.

Following her initial period with the Coyote Sisters, Kunkel qualified as an attorney, and has been in private practice for over twenty years. She is a member of the state bar associations of California and Massachusetts, with a practice concentration in entertainment law, and lives in Northampton, Massachusetts.

Discography

Solo albums 
 Leah Kunkel (1979) Columbia Records
 I Run With Trouble (1980) Columbia Records

With the Coyote Sisters 
 The Coyote Sisters by the Coyote Sisters (1984)
 Women And Other Visions by the Coyote Sisters (2001)

Vocal appearances 
Kunkel has appeared as a guest vocalist on the following albums:
 Dave Mason & Cass Elliot by Dave Mason and Cass Elliot (1971)
 Jackson Browne by Jackson Browne (1972) on "From Silver Lake"
 Another Passenger by Carly Simon (1976) on "In Times When My Head"
 Amigo by Arlo Guthrie (1976)
 JT by James Taylor (1977) on "Handy Man"
 Watermark by Art Garfunkel (1977)
 Craig Fuller & Eric Kaz by Craig Fuller and Eric Kaz (1978)
 Fate for Breakfast by Art Garfunkel (1979)
 An American Dream by The Dirt Band (1979) on "Dance the Night Away" and one other song
 Scissors Cut by Art Garfunkel (1981)
 Angel Heart by Jimmy Webb (1982)
 Lefty by Art Garfunkel (1988)
 Suspending Disbelief by Jimmy Webb (1993)

References

External links 
 Coyote Sisters official website
 Faculty profile at Western New England School of Law

1948 births
American women pop singers
American people of Russian-Jewish descent
Jewish American musicians
Dunhill Records artists
Living people
21st-century American Jews
21st-century American women